The European Liberal Protestant Network is an association of free Christians and Liberal Protestants of Europe.
It had its inaugural meeting at Bad Boll, Germany, July 1998 among Protestant members of the International Association for Religious Freedom.

Church Members
 Free Christian Association (Germany)
 Free Christian Association (Switzerland)
 General Assembly of Unitarian and Free Christian Churches (Great Britain)
 Liberal Protestant Association/L'Association Libérale (France)
 l'Assemblée fraternelle des chrétiens unitariens (AFCU)
 Evangile et Liberté
 Non-subscribing Presbyterian Church of Ireland
 Remonstrant Brotherhood (The Netherlands)
 Unitarian Church of Transylvania
 Hungarian Unitarian Church

External links
Archive of the old European Liberal Protestant Network website—Internet Archive Wayback Machine

Liberal Christianity denominations
Protestant ecumenism
Christian organizations established in 1998
Christian ecumenical organizations